Tsae-seng Sing (1861–1940) was an Anglican  bishop in China.

Sing's father (Name Romanized as Shen) was the first clergyman in Chekiang Province. He was educated at Trinity College, Ningpo and ordained in 1890. He was Headmaster of his old college for 29 years. He was also Archdeacon of Chekiang from 1910 to 1918. In that year he was consecrated at Holy Trinity Church, Shanghai to be an Assistant Bishop in the Diocese of North China, making him the first person of Chinese descent to be made a Bishop in the Anglican Communion.

References

1864 births
1940 deaths
People from Zhejiang
Alumni of Trinity College, Ningpo
Anglican missionary bishops in China
Archdeacons of Chekiang
20th-century Anglican bishops in China
Anglican bishops of North China